The Lake Urana Nature Reserve is a protected nature reserve situated adjacent to Lake Urana, a salt lake, that is located in the Riverina region of New South Wales in eastern Australia. The  lake is shallow and intermittently filled by flooding that forms in a natural depression. The lake fills every 10 to 20 years and retains water for several years; with no natural outflow, it is drained via evaporation.

Flora 
The woodland in the reserve includes yellow box and white cypress pine. Shrubs include thorny saltbush, ruby saltbush, western golden wattle, emu bush, and black cottongrass. Ground cover is made up of grasses and herbs, with over 70 species having been recorded, including wiregrass, speargrass, and nodding chocolate lily (Dichopogon fimbriatus). On the shore is a narrow area of red gum woodland.

Fauna 
Fauna includes eastern grey kangaroos, and 37 bird species have been identified. When the lake floods, waterbirds such as wood ducks, Pacific black duck, Australian grey teal, yellow-billed spoonbill, black-fronted dotterel, and magpie larks visit.

See also

 Protected areas of New South Wales

References

External links

Nature reserves in New South Wales
Riverina
Protected areas established in 1996
1996 establishments in Australia